Kumanogawa Dam is a gravity dam located in Toyama prefecture in Japan. The dam is used for flood control, water supply and power production. The catchment area of the dam is 39.8 km2. The dam impounds about 34  ha of land when full and can store 9100 thousand cubic meters of water. The construction of the dam was started on 1970 and completed in 1984.

References

Dams in Toyama Prefecture
1984 establishments in Japan